Muhammad cartoon may refer to:

Charlie Hebdo shooting
Curtis Culwell Center attack
Everybody Draw Mohammed Day
Jyllands-Posten Muhammad cartoons controversy